The CEV qualification for the 2010 FIVB Volleyball Men's World Championship saw member nations compete for eight places at the finals in Italy.

Draw
35 of the 55 CEV national teams entered qualification. (Iceland later withdrew) The teams were distributed according to their position in the FIVB Senior Men's Rankings as of 5 January 2008 using the serpentine system for their distribution. (Rankings shown in brackets) Teams ranked 1–6 did not compete in the first and second rounds, and automatically qualified for the third round. Teams ranked 7–20 did not compete in the first round, and automatically qualified for the second round.

First round

 Iceland withdrew and Belarus replaced Iceland in Pool A to balance the number of teams in each group.
Second round

Third round

First round

Pool A
Venue:  English Institute of Sport, Sheffield, United Kingdom
Dates: January 2–4, 2009
All times are Greenwich Mean Time (UTC±00:00)

|}

|}

Pool B
Venue:  Olympic Sports Centre, Riga, Latvia
Dates: January 2–4, 2009
All times are Eastern European Time (UTC+02:00)

|}

|}

Pool C
Venue:  Budocenter, Vienna, Austria
Dates: January 3–5, 2009
All times are Central European Time (UTC+01:00)

|}

|}

Pool D
Venue:  Olympic and Leisure Complex, Quba, Azerbaijan
Dates: January 9–11, 2009
All times are Azerbaijan Time (UTC+04:00)

|}

|}

Second round

Pool E
Venue:  Aréna Poprad, Poprad, Slovakia
Dates: May 29–31, 2009
All times are Central European Summer Time (UTC+02:00)

|}

|}

Pool F
Venue:  Topsportcentrum, Rotterdam, Netherlands
Dates: May 30–June 1, 2009
All times are Central European Summer Time (UTC+02:00)

|}

|}

Pool G
Venue:  Pavilhão Desportivo Municipal, Póvoa de Varzim, Portugal
Dates: May 27–31, 2009
All times are Western European Summer Time (UTC+01:00)

|}

|}

Pool H
Venue:  Tipsport Arena, Liberec, Czech Republic
Dates: May 27–31, 2009
All times are Central European Summer Time (UTC+02:00)

|}

|}

Third round

Pool I
Venue:  Tampereen jäähalli, Tampere, Finland
Dates: August 7–9, 2009
All times are Eastern European Summer Time (UTC+03:00)

|}

|}

Pool J
Venue:  Palace of Culture and Sports, Varna, Bulgaria
Dates: August 14–16, 2009
All times are Eastern European Summer Time (UTC+03:00)

|}

|}

Pool K
Venue:  Gdynia Sports Arena, Gdynia, Poland
Dates: August 14–16, 2009
All times are Central European Summer Time (UTC+02:00)

|}

|}

Pool L
Venue:  Hala Sportova Jezero, Kragujevac, Serbia
Dates: August 14–16, 2009
All times are Central European Summer Time (UTC+02:00)

|}

|}

References

External links
 2010 World Championship Qualification

2010 FIVB Volleyball Men's World Championship
2009 in volleyball
FIVB Volleyball World Championship qualification